Betty Jo Charlton (June 15, 1923 – July 22, 2014) was an American politician.

Born in Reno County, Kansas, Charlton went to the University of Kansas. She then worked in the Charlton Insurance Agency where she meet her husband. Charlton served in the Kansas House of Representatives from 1980 until 1994 as a Democrat; she was originally appointed in 1980 to replace Michael Glover, who resigned his seat, and then was re-elected in her own right.

She died in Lawrence, Kansas.

Notes

1923 births
2014 deaths
People from Reno County, Kansas
University of Kansas alumni
Women state legislators in Kansas
Democratic Party members of the Kansas House of Representatives
20th-century American women politicians
20th-century American politicians
21st-century American women